The Rose Institute of State and Local Government is a research institute based out of Claremont McKenna College in Claremont, California. It was founded in 1973 by businesswoman, lawyer, feminist and activist Edessa Rose. The Rose Institute is particularly well known for its expertise on elections, demographic, fiscal and public policy analysis.

History

In 1973, businesswoman and lawyer, feminist and activist Edessa Rose founded the Rose Institute of State and Local Government as a part of Claremont McKenna College to address issues specific to California's state and local governments. In its early period (1973–1990), the Rose Institute developed the nation's first comprehensive statewide demographic and political database. Faculty, staff, and students worked together to match California's 50,000 precincts to its 5,000-plus census tracts, following the political and demographic trends in the state. In 1979, the California Business Roundtable gave a million dollar grant to fund a significant redistricting reform and education program at the institute.

From the start, the institute committed itself to conducting research with faculty-student teams. Over the years, more than 400 students of Claremont McKenna College, Claremont Graduate University and the other Claremont Colleges have worked in the Rose Institute. Students have contributed significantly to the institute's survey research programs, providing high-quality interviewing services, assisting in data presentation, and often playing key roles in analysis. Today, all Rose Institute students are trained in GIS, survey research, fiscal analysis, and legal and regulatory analysis.

In 2010, the Rose Institute partnered with the Lowe Institute for Political Economy to establish the Inland Empire Center. Before the partnership, there was very little political and economic analysis of the region, despite the Inland Empire ranking as the 14th largest metropolitan statistical area (MSA) in the United States at the time. Recognizing the significance of the region to California's economy, the two institutes—both based at Claremont McKenna College—saw the need for an organization that could deliver analysis on current issues impacting the Inland Empire.

In 2014, the institute's founding director and former CMC dean of faculty, David Alan Heslop, was sentenced to 21 months in federal prison after pleading guilty to one count of felony conspiracy to commit bribery for his role in a kickback scheme that bilked the Twentynine Palms Band of Mission Indians out of hundreds of thousands of dollars.

In 2021, Kenneth P. Miller was appointed the new director of the Rose Institute.

Projects

For both public and private clients, the institute performs economic impact studies with the goal of clarifying the budgetary impact of particular policy proposals; handles survey projects from start to finish, designing the questionnaire, collecting the data, and assessing the policy implications; and works with cities, counties, and other entities to evaluate present policy and recommend future fiscal and policy changes.

These projects have addressed a range of topics, including tribal sovereignty, transportation, housing, and water quality and availability. In one recent project, Rose Institute researchers conducted a comparative analysis of public services in California's largest counties for Voice of San Diego, a prominent online news organization. The institute also conducts research on legal and constitutional issues, such as the impact of a full-time legislature and the history of initiatives in California and other states, resulting in the Miller-Rose Institute Initiative Database—the most complete online database of voter-approved statewide ballot initiatives:
[roseinstitute.org/initiatives].

Miller-Rose Initiative Database 

The Miller-Rose Initiative Database summarizes original research on statewide ballot initiatives throughout the United States from post-election legal challenges to initiatives. The result is a legal resource available complete with expert analysis on the implications for California politics.

California Almanac 

The California Almanac is a resource for California residents to learn more about their local elected officials and discover their own cities. Information included ranges from demographic statistics to contact information for elected officials.

Redistricting in America 

Redistricting in America is the crowning achievement of the Rose Institute following the 2010 census, keeping Americans up-to-date on the effects of redistricting and gerrymandering. Students and staff work to provide in-depth analysis on the legal and social implications of redistricting, as well as providing descriptions on each state's mechanisms for redrawing congressional lines.

Inland Empire Center aka Inland Empire Vision 

The Inland Empire Center is the Rose Institute's partnership with the Lowe Institute for Political Economy, in conducting the annual economic forecast conferences held in Southern California, initially with the help of the UCLA Anderson School of Management. The Inland Empire Center also partners with the Rose Institute to publish the Inland Empire Outlook.

Inland Empire Outlook 
The Inland Empire Outlook is a biannual publication of the Rose Institute that focuses on the economic and political analysis of the Inland Empire and its surrounding communities. The articles are researched and written by undergraduate research assistants under the supervision of a senior staff or faculty affiliate of the institute.

Kosmont-Rose Institute Cost of Doing Business Survey 

A Kosmont-Rose Survey for local governments and businesses across America to investigate the costs of doing business in their locales. The project measures businesses taxes and living expenses to gauge the "friendliness" to businesses across various cities.

Video Voter Series 

One of the newest of the Rose Institute's projects, Video Voter is a resource in which voters can find information about upcoming votes on California initiatives. The result is a consolidated source of information for voters with questions about initiatives on the ballot.

Southern California Policy Analysis 

While the Rose Institute analyzes state and local government policies throughout California and the nation, it places special emphasis on Southern California.

The Rose Institute conducts fiscal, regulatory, and survey analysis for counties, municipal governments, Native American tribal governments, news organizations, and other businesses across Southern California—from Los Angeles and Orange County to the Inland Empire and San Diego. Through
this work, the Rose has developed a sophisticated understanding of this dynamic region's diverse political and economic institutions.

In a joint venture with the Lowe Institute of Political Economy, the Rose Institute recently launched the Inland Empire Center for Economics and Public Policy. The Inland Empire is one of the fastest growing places in the United States and now has a larger population than 24 states. The Center publishes Inland Empire Outlook, an economic and political newsletter, and has created new indices that will become leading measures of the Inland Empire's economic activity. These indices, along with specialized public policy analysis and modeling, will be published regularly in print and online, and presented at conferences in the Inland Empire hosted jointly with the UCLA Anderson Forecast.

Other Ongoing Projects 

Especially noteworthy contracts in the institute's recent history include: research on representation conducted for the California Roundtable; work on juvenile justice codes performed by Professor Ralph Rossum for the US Department of Justice; fiscal analyses of Orange, Los Angeles, Riverside and Monterey Counties by Dr. Steven B. Frates; an atlas of South Central Los Angeles created for the Ford Foundation in the wake of the Watts riots; and survey and data work for the San Gabriel Valley Economic Partnership and the San Fernando Economic Alliance.

Notable alumni 

David Dreier, former member of the United States House of Representatives.
Sean Elsbernd, former member of the San Francisco Board of Supervisor and U.S. senator Dianne Feinstein's state director

References

External links
Rose Blog official website
redistrictinginamerica.org A comprehensive source for information about redistricting in all fifty states
Rose Institute Publications website- contains publications on California political history and United States redistricting information

Research institutes in California
1973 establishments in California
Nonpartisan organizations in the United States
Political and economic think tanks in the United States
Claremont McKenna College
Organizations established in 1973